This is a list of seasons played by INAC Kobe Leonessa, a Japanese women's football club from Kobe competing in the Japan Women's Football League's premier championship, which has won in three occasions. Leonessa was created in 2001 and plays in the Noevir Stadium Kobe.

Summary

Overall championship top scorers are marked in bold.

INAC Leonessa
INAC Leonessa